Jessica Araceli González (born December 25, 1980) is an American politician serving as a member of the Texas House of Representatives for the 104th district. Elected in November 2018, she assumed office on January 8, 2019.

Early life and education

González was born and raised in Dallas. She received her Bachelor of Arts in criminology and criminal justice from the University of Texas at Arlington. She later attended Western Michigan University Cooley Law School, where she received her Juris Doctor and graduated cum laude.

Career 
Prior to serving in the Texas Legislature, González was a legislative assistant for Congresswoman Karen Bass and participated in the White House Internship Program. She was also the Nevada voter protection director for the Barack Obama 2012 presidential campaign.

She practices personal injury at her law firm, Gandara & González, PLLC, located in Oak Cliff, Dallas.

Texas Legislature
González assumed office on January 8, 2019. She defeated Democratic incumbent Roberto Alonzo in the Democratic primary election 62.5% to 37.5%.

The Dallas Morning News recommended Jessica González saying "We believe her smarts and dedication offer a fresh start and more promise for the residents of the district than an ineffectual incumbent who is often unreachable and unresponsive."

González authored legislation in the 86th legislative session focused on reforming our criminal justice system, expanding voting rights, and fighting for affordable housing. She also serves at Vice-Chair of the Texas House LGBTQ Caucus and the vice chair of the National Hispanic Caucus of State Legislators' Human and Civil Rights Task Force. González was also a co-founder of the Texas House LGBTQ Caucus during the 86th legislative session. González was a vocal advocate against SB 1978, also known as the "Save-Chick-Fill-A Bill". She said, "As the vice-chair of the House LGBTQ caucus, I will continue to fight against any legislation that attacks Texans for who they love or how they identify."

During the 86th legislative session, González passed one bill allowing the redevelopment of property in Oak Cliff owned by Oak Farms Dairy. In addition, she fought for an amendment dealing with the price of natural gas to consumers. The amendment ultimately passed after Senator Royce West picked it up in the Senate.

González serves on the House Committee on Criminal Jurisprudence and the House Committee on Urban Affairs. In addition, she was the co-founder of the Texas Criminal Justice Reform Caucus, is a member of the Texas Women's Health Caucus, the Texas Veterans Caucus, and she is the Secretary of the Young Legislator Group. In 2019, she led a redistricting panel at the MAP Conference.

Personal life 
González married Angela Hale in 2021.

References 

Women state legislators in Texas
Hispanic and Latino American state legislators in Texas
Hispanic and Latino American women in politics
Democratic Party members of the Texas House of Representatives
Living people
Western Michigan University Cooley Law School alumni
Texas lawyers
21st-century American lawyers
Politicians from Dallas
Lawyers from Dallas
LGBT state legislators in Texas
21st-century American women lawyers
21st-century American politicians
1980 births
21st-century American women politicians